Obunga is a surname. Notable people with the surname include:

 Harold Obunga (1959–1995), Kenyan boxer
 Jacob Obunga (born 1994), Kenyan musician known professionally as Otile Brown
 Obunga, a satirical nickname for Barack Obama derived from a 2013 internet meme

See also
 Otunga (surname)
 Garry's Mod

Surnames of Kenyan origin